Queen of the Chorus is a 1928 American silent drama film directed by Charles J. Hunt and starring Virginia Brown Faire, Rex Lease and Betty Francisco. It was made by the independent producer Morris R. Schlank.

Synopsis
Broadway chorus girl Queenie falls in love with a man who pretends to be a millionaire but is actually impersonating his boss. When his employer returns from Europe, he in turn tries to win over Queenie by showering her with gifts.

Cast
 Virginia Brown Faire as 'Queenie' Dale
 Rex Lease as 	Billy Cooke
 Lloyd Whitlock as Gordon Trent
 Betty Francisco as Flossie de Vere
 Harriet Hammond as Mrs. Gordon Trent
 Charles Hill Mailes as 	Rufus Van Der Layden
 Crauford Kent as Spencer Steele

References

Bibliography
 Connelly, Robert B. The Silents: Silent Feature Films, 1910-36, Volume 40, Issue 2. December Press, 1998.
 Munden, Kenneth White. The American Film Institute Catalog of Motion Pictures Produced in the United States, Part 1. University of California Press, 1997.

External links
 

1928 films
1928 drama films
1920s English-language films
American silent feature films
Silent American drama films
American black-and-white films
Films directed by Charles J. Hunt
Films set in New York City
1920s American films